The House That Jack Built is a 2018 psychological horror slasher film written and directed by Lars von Trier. It stars Matt Dillon, Bruno Ganz, Uma Thurman, Siobhan Fallon Hogan, Sofie Gråbøl, Riley Keough, and Jeremy Davies. Its plot follows Jack (Dillon), a serial killer who, over a 12-year period from the late 1970s into 1980s, commits numerous murders in the U.S. state of Washington. Utilizing Dante's Inferno as a metatext, the film is structured as a series of flashback vignettes relayed by Jack to the Roman poet Virgil, during which Jack attempts to make an argument for his crimes.

Originally conceived as a television project by von Trier, The House That Jack Built began production in Sweden in 2016. The film debuted at the Cannes Film Festival, marking von Trier's return to the festival after more than six years. The House That Jack Built received polarized feedback from critics, with criticism aimed for its graphic violence but praise for Dillon's performance and Von Trier's direction. The film's protagonist was compared to a real life serial killer Ted Bundy.

Plot

Jack, a failed architect in 1980s Washington State, recounts how he became a serial killer to Virgil—whom he refers to as Verge—as Verge leads Jack through the nine circles of Hell. Each of Jack's crimes, depicted through flashback, feature social commentary from both Jack and Verge.

In the first incident, Jack encounters an abrasive woman on a rural road who needs to fix her broken jack to repair a flat tire. He agrees to take her to a local blacksmith to repair it. On the way, she says he looks like a serial killer and insults him. When they return, the jack breaks again. The woman requests that Jack return her to the blacksmith. On the second trip, she recants her comments stating he is too much of a wimp to kill anyone. Offended by her manner, Jack bludgeons her with the tire jack. He stores her body in an industrial freezer inside a factory building, which he purchased from a pizzeria.

In the second incident, Jack cons his way into the home of a widow, Claire, then strangles and stabs her. After cleaning up, he puts her body in the back of his car. Instead of leaving, his obsessive-compulsive disorder compels him to return to re-clean the crime scene multiple times, nearly resulting in him being caught when a suspicious police officer stops by. Jack manages to outwit the officer by pretending to be an acquaintance of Claire. He then ties Claire's body to the back of the van in a panic and drives off, dragging her body behind and creating a blood trail. It starts raining, washing away the trail, and Jack takes this as divine intervention, believing God is on his side. Jack puts her corpse in the industrial freezer. He declares himself "Mr. Sophistication," and begins signing anonymous letters to the media with this moniker. He also develops a fetish for photographing his victims' corpses and begins taking greater risks as his OCD diminishes, such as impulsively hitting an old woman with his van.

In the third incident, Jack brings his girlfriend and her two sons, Grumpy and George, on a hunting trip. He kills both sons with a rifle before forcing the woman to have a picnic with their corpses. Jack then allows the mother to run away as he gives her a head start in his hunting tower. She does not comply and purposefully allows herself to be shot by Jack. Jack then waits for rigor mortis to set in on Grumpy's corpse, and proceeds to fashion it into a waving sculpture with a grisly smile.

In the fourth incident, Jack is in a dysfunctional relationship with Jacqueline, whom he psychologically and verbally abuses and derisively nicknames "Simple". When he drunkenly confesses to her that he has killed 60 people, she does not believe him. After he marks red circles around her breasts with a marker, she becomes frightened and approaches a policeman, but he dismisses her as drunk. In her apartment, Jack binds her before cutting off her breasts with a knife. He pins one of the breasts to the policeman's car and fashions the other into a wallet.

In the fifth incident, Jack has detained six men in his freezer, intending to kill all of them with a single bullet. Upon realizing his ammunition has been mislabeled, he leaves and chastises the gun shop owner before visiting a friend, SP. SP phones a police officer and Jack stabs SP through the throat. He waits for the police, then kills the officer. He returns to his freezer, and needing more space to focus the scope of his rifle, unseals a closed door inside, revealing a second chamber. Inside, he meets Verge, who reveals he has been observing Jack throughout his life and reminds him that he has never built the home he intended to, as Jack had made several attempts to build his perfect house between his murders. In the freezer, Jack arranges the frozen corpses he has collected over the years into the shape of a house. As police break in, Jack enters his "house" and follows Verge into a hole in the floor, entering Hell.

The two reach a pit leading to the ninth circle and centre of Hell. In the process of descending into hell, footage is shown about the Kola Superdeep Borehole, in which, according to legend, human cries from the underworld, which Verge mentions, were heard. A broken bridge spans the pit. Jack notices a stairway on the other side of the bridge, which Verge says leads the way out of Hell. Jack attempts to scale a rock wall to access the staircase, against Verge's advice, and falls into the flaming abyss below.

Cast

Production

Development
Von Trier originally developed the idea as a television series, but in February 2016, he announced that it would be a film. After extensively researching serial killers, von Trier had a completed script by May 2016. International sales rights for the film belong to TrustNordisk with von Trier's Zentropa producing. Film i Väst partly financed the film, and the Copenhagen Film Fund provided €1.08 million in production subsidies. The film is a co-production between France, Germany, Sweden, and Denmark.

The film's epilogue, in which Jack goes to Hell, was suggested by Von Trier's co-writer, Jenle Hallund, and which Von Trier felt appropriate: "I thought that's a good idea because it's a long time since we've really visited Hell in films. Particularly the journey to Hell. We put it together from different conceptions, or whatever the word is, of Hell. The Elysian Fields is something from the Roman mythology. I'm quite sure that Hell doesn't look like what we have made for this film." Von Trier also stated he was inspired by Alfred Hitchcock to give the film a "classical ending" in which Jack is punished: "Somehow I felt a little Hitchcock-like at the end of the film, with Jack hanging there above the abject depths. Never let the bad guy hang on his nails, as the audience won't care... Psychopaths act out of an irrational certainty that they won't be caught. That's why the ending is like it is. It would be typical for me to let him live. But then I thought about good old Hitchcock and decided that this calls for a classical ending."

Casting
On 2 November 2016, von Trier announced that Matt Dillon would play the film's lead role. Announcements soon followed in February 2017 that Riley Keough and Sofie Gråbøl would also be joining the production with Uma Thurman's participation being announced the following month. The same month, von Trier described the film as celebrating "the idea that life is evil and soulless".

Filming
Principal photography began in March 2017 outside Bengtsfors and Tösse in Dalsland, Sweden and was shot in Copenhagen, Gribskov, Trollhättan, Peak District and Montemerano. Dillon was initially influenced by American serial killer Ted Bundy, but his character soon became unique. Von Trier split the filming into two parts to allow editing in between, something he had done before. The film spent nearly a year in post-production, which included complicated special effects.

Release

Theatrical
In March 2017, von Trier was reportedly negotiating to have the film premiere at the Cannes Film Festival, despite his being previously banned from the festival. On 19 April 2018, the film was approved to premiere at the Festival out-of-competition. After the announcement, a teaser trailer was released.

The film premiered at the Festival on 14 May 2018. It was reported that more than 100 audience members walked out during the premiere, though a 10-minute standing ovation followed the screening.

In October 2018, it was reported that the director's cut, which is the uncensored version that played at Cannes, would play in U.S. theaters for one night in November, followed by an edited R-rated version release in selected theaters and on digital platforms beginning on 14 December. Immediately following the unrated director's cut screenings, the Motion Picture Association of America (MPAA) issued a statement condemning the screening for not adhering to the board's guidelines. In the statement, it was noted that "the screening of an unrated version of the film in such close proximity to the release of the rated version—without obtaining a waiver—is in violation of the rating system's rules.... Failure to comply with the rules can create confusion among parents and undermine the rating system — and may result in the imposition of sanctions against the film's submitter." By the 5 December, the MPAA had resolved the dispute with IFC Films by pushing the digital release of the director's cut back to 2019, as opposed to coinciding with the December 14 theatrical release of the R-rated cut. On 6 December 2018, the director's cut was released to purchase on YouTube for several hours.

Home media
The House That Jack Built was released on DVD and Blu-ray disc (uncensored cut) in the United Kingdom on 4 March 2019 by Artificial Eye. Extra features include an introduction by director, an in-depth interview with director, a twenty-minute making-of featurette and theatrical Trailer. On 4 February 2020, Scream Factory released the film in the United States as a 2-disc Blu-ray with both cuts (theatrical and director's), as well as a 26-minute interview with von Trier by professor Peter Schepelern, filmed shortly after von Trier's winning of the Sonning Prize. Also included is the US theatrical trailer, the Cannes Film Festival teaser trailer, a short introduction from von Trier, and von Trier's 2016 announcement of the film's production.

Reception

Box office
The House That Jack Built has grossed US$5,566,776.

Critical response
The film polarized critics, and was described as 2018's "most extreme and controversial" horror film. On Rotten Tomatoes, the film holds an approval rating of 60% based on 138 reviews, and an average rating of 6.20. The website's critical consensus reads, "The House That Jack Built presents writer-director Lars von Trier at his most proudly uncompromising: hard to ignore, and for many viewers, just as difficult to digest." On Metacritic, the film has a weighted average score of 42 out of 100 based on 29 critics, indicating "mixed or average reviews".

IndieWire critic Eric Kohn gave the film an "A−" and called the film a "wild masterpiece." BBC.com's Nicolas Barber gave the film four stars out of five and said "Undoubtedly a bold and stimulating film which no one but Denmark's notorious provocateur-auteur could have made." Owen Gleiberman from Variety gave the film a positive review, and stated "It's halfway between a subversive good movie and a stunt. It's designed to get under your skin, and does." David Rooney of The Hollywood Reporter wrote "The House That Jack Built is definitely something to see. But what's most surprising is that it's just as often inane as unsettling." Armond White says the film satirizes "guilt-free violence" by "rubbing the audience's face in the ugliness it enjoys." The Guardians Peter Bradshaw referred to the film as "an ordeal of gruesomeness and tiresomeness", though he did praise its closing scene.

Mark Olsen of the Los Angeles Times criticized the film for reveling in "grisly, in-your-face violence and wan philosophical digressions," concluding, "Von Trier has managed to cobble together just enough of interest — odd moments, pieces of performance, stray ideas and the simple audacity of putting this mess out into the world, that it feels like there may be something there worth considering, a maddening possibility. And that may be his cruelest prank of all."
Despite audience backlash toward a scene involving the main character's mutilation of a duckling when he was a child, PETA has defended the film in a statement praising its accurate portrayal of the link between adolescent animal abuse and psychopathy and for the realistic special effects.

According to Zinaida Pronchenko, "When the offended viewers who have moved on the wrong track hurry to the exit, von Trier will not without satisfaction show the middle finger at their backs, and those who remain will witness the moralizing finale. Evil will be punished, thrown into the flaming abyss and will never return, as stated in the refrain of the song "Hit the Road Jack", cheerfully playing on the credits".

Accolades
The film was nominated for Art Cinema Award and Hamburg Producers Award at the 26th Hamburg Film Festival. It won Best European Film and was nominated for Best International Feature Film at the Strasbourg European Fantastic Film Festival. It won two awards in Canary Islands Fantastic Film Festival – Best Actor for Dillon and Best Screenplay for von Trier. At the Robert Awards, the film received 11 nominations: Best Danish Film, Best Director, Best Original Screenplay, Best Actor, Best Production Design, Best Cinematography, Best Costume Design, Best Makeup, Best Editing, Best Sound Design and Best Visual Effects. It won two awards, Best Cinematography and Best Visual Effects. Dillon received a Best Actor nomination at the Bodil Awards, where the film won Best Production Design. The film is also nominated for Best Foreign Film at the Gopo Awards, and Dillon was a nominee in the Fangoria Chainsaw Awards' Best Actor category.

Cahiers du cinéma selected The House That Jack Built as the eighth-best film of 2018.

References

External links 
 
 
 
 
 

2018 horror films
2010s serial killer films
Cultural depictions of Virgil
French horror films
French serial killer films
Danish horror films
German horror films
German serial killer films
Swedish horror films
English-language Danish films
English-language French films
English-language German films
English-language Swedish films
Films directed by Lars von Trier
Films set in hell
Films set in Washington (state)
Films set in the 1970s
Films set in the 1980s
Films shot in Sweden
Films about obsessive–compulsive disorder
IFC Films films
Zentropa films
2010s English-language films
Films produced by Louise Vesth
2010s French films
2010s German films
2010s Swedish films